In semiconductors, valence bands are well characterized  by 3 Luttinger parameters. At the Г-point in the band structure,  and  orbitals form valence bands. But spin–orbit coupling splits sixfold degeneracy into high energy 4-fold and lower energy 2-fold bands. Again 4-fold degeneracy is lifted into heavy- and light hole bands by phenomenological Hamiltonian by J. M. Luttinger.

Three valence band state
In the presence of spin–orbit interaction, total angular momentum should take part in.

The spin–orbit interaction from the relativistic quantum mechanics, lowers the energy of  states down.

Phenomenological Hamiltonian for the j=3/2 states
Phenomenological Hamiltonian in spherical approximation is written as

Phenomenological Luttinger parameters  are defined as

and

Two degenerated resulting eigenenergies are

 for 

 for 

 indicates heav-(light-) hole band energy. If we regard the electrons as nearly free electrons, the Luttinger parameters describe effective mass of electron in each bands.

Measurement
Luttinger parameter can be measured by hot-electron luminescence experiment.

Example: GaAs
In gallium arsenide,

References

Further reading

 
 
 

Semiconductors